Warburton's Wood Nature Reserve is a nature reserve near Kingsley, Cheshire, England, managed by the Cheshire Wildlife Trust.

The reserve consists of semi-natural woodland either side of a clough, or small valley, containing a tributary of the River Weaver.

Trees include familiar species such as pedunculate oak (Quercus robur), ash (Fraxinus excelsior) and hazel (Corylus avellana), but also small-leaved lime (Tilia cordata) and wild service-tree (Sorbus torminalis), which are uncommon in Cheshire.

The Wildlife Trust also owns the adjacent Hunter's Wood Nature Reserve, on which trees have been planted to act as a wildlife corridor, and with the hope that specialist plants from the ancient woodland will eventually colonise.

References 

Nature reserves in Cheshire
Sites of Special Scientific Interest in Cheshire
Cheshire Wildlife Trust reserves